The Benetton B190 is a Formula One racing car designed by Rory Byrne in collaboration with Benetton's Technical Director, John Barnard, a designer with experience at racing companies McLaren and Ferrari and arguably the most successful Formula One designer of the 1980s with his cars winning 31 races since  (Barnard also enjoyed success designing the ground effects Chaparral 2K that won the 1980 Indianapolis 500). Geoff Goddard, chief designer at Cosworth was responsible for designing the car's engine, which was of exclusive use for Benetton. The B190 was raced by Benetton in all but the first two races of the 1990 Formula One season.

Background
At the end of 1985 Benetton stepped up its involvement in Formula One after acquiring the Toleman and Spirit teams (Benetton had been Toleman's major sponsor in 1985 as well as Alfa).

South African Rory Byrne, head designer for the team who had designed the Benetton B186 that had given the team its first win, assisted former McLaren and Ferrari designer John Barnard with the design of the B190 (Barnard joined the team in 1990 as its Technical Director). The B190 was the team's first naturally aspirated car to feature the air box located above the drivers head. Its predecessors, the B188 and B189, featured twin air intakes located either side of the cockpit on top of the side pods. All of the cars were designed by Byrne.

Competition history
The B190, which replaced the highly successful B189, utilized the Ford HBA4 V8 engine. Through the season, Piquet and Alessandro Nannini successfully kept the B190 apace with other front runners including the  V10 McLaren-Honda's and Williams-Renault's, and Ferrari's V12 with its Semi-automatic transmission, despite the power advantage the multi-cylinder engines had over the Ford V8. Indeed, at some races, the Ford-powered Benetton's were as fast in a straight line as the more powerful multi-cylinder engines, the lower weight of the V8 allowing the team to use less downforce which also reduced tyre wear.

What the HBA4 lacked in power to the multi-cylinder engines was generally made up by being smaller and lighter than its main competitors, giving it a lower centre of gravity (weight distribution) which offered a significant handling benefit. The Ford V8 had less frictional losses and therefore thermal discharge than its rivals, meaning less plumbing and smaller radiators could be used, significantly increasing the aerodynamic efficiency of the B190 and improving its co-efficient of drag, which explains the very competitive straight line speed of the B190 in 1990.

After placing third in the Spanish Grand Prix, the popular, chain-smoking Italian Nannini was seriously injured in a helicopter crash near his home in Siena, Italy. The crash severed his right forearm, putting a premature end to a promising Formula One career (doctors were able to re-attach the limb using Micro-surgery and Nannini has since regained partial use of it). On Piquet's recommendation, he was replaced by Brazilian driver Roberto Moreno for the last two Grand Prix races.

Piquet won the final two races of the season, including a 1–2 finish for Piquet and Moreno at the controversial Japanese Grand Prix. During the season's last race in Adelaide, Australia (the 500th World Championship Grand Prix held since it all began in ), Piquet won after holding off former Williams teammate Nigel Mansell who was racing in a Ferrari.

The 18 points gained from the last two races saw Piquet move to third in the Drivers' Championship, behind the year's champion Ayrton Senna (McLaren) and runner-up Alain Prost (Ferrari), and the team was awarded third place in the Constructors' Championship, again behind McLaren and Ferrari.

B190B

The B190 was updated for the first two races of the  season and was dubbed the B190B. This updated model was subsequently replaced for the 1991 San Marino Grand Prix by the first "nose-up" car for the team, the B191.

Complete Formula One results
(key)

* 4 points scored in  using Benetton B189B* 32.5 points scored in  using Benetton B191

References

External links

B190
1990 Formula One season cars
1991 Formula One season cars